Mordellistena atrocinctipennis is a beetle in the genus Mordellistena of the family Mordellidae. It was described in 1927 by Píc.

References

atrocinctipennis
Beetles described in 1927